Levante, located in Castel Goffredo, Italy, is a marketer and manufacturer of hosiery.

Information
Levante was founded in 1969, but began the business in the year of 1991. They are known for the distribution and sale of hosiery, socks, and body wear. The products are exclusively distributed through Australia and New Zealand. Their distributor is the Ambra Corporation. Levante is one of the largest Italian hosiery brands in Australia. This brand is also known be a part of the higher end of hosiery. Their products include the styles of Italian knitting with yarn technologies.

References

External links
Levante USA website
Levante Germany website

Clothing companies of Italy
Hosiery brands
Italian companies established in 1969
Textile companies of Italy
Italian brands
Companies based in Mantua